Melvin Tong Man-chung (born 19 February 1975) is a Hong Kong former professional tennis player.

Tennis career
Tong represented Hong Kong at the 1998 Asian Games and was a doubles bronze medalist at the 2001 National Games of China, partnering John Hui. Between 1994 and 2002 he featured in 15 Davis Cup ties for Hong Kong. 

On the ATP Tour he received a wildcard to compete in the singles main draw at the Hong Kong Open in both 1997 and 2000. In the 1997 edition he lost his first round match to world number three Michael Chang.

An at times temperamental player, Tong received a one-year ban by South China Athletic Association in 1999, following his verbal abuse of a female umpire at the Coca-Cola Open, during a match where he was also accused of deliberately hitting a linesman twice with his serves.

References

External links
 
 
 

1975 births
Living people
Hong Kong male tennis players
Tennis players at the 1998 Asian Games
Asian Games competitors for Hong Kong